Dioryctria yatesi, the mountain pine coneworm, is a species of snout moth in the genus Dioryctria. It was described by Akira Mutuura and Eugene G. Munroe in 1979 and is limited to the mountains of the coastal south-eastern United States and Tennessee.

The larvae feed on Pinus pungens. They bore the cones of their host plant.

References

Moths described in 1979
yatesi